This is a complete list of extant pre-modern Noh plays, their supposed authors, and categorisations. A short English translation of the title is given where one exists. A list of those plays which have a separate article on Wikipedia can be found here.

Some plays are given different names by different schools. The words bangai kyoku signify that a play is no longer part of current repertoire.

References

Noh plays
Noh plays